Live 1994 is a live album by Pentangle, released in 1994. It was reissued along with One More Road on CD in 2007.

Track listing
"Bramble Briar"
"Sally Free and Easy"
"Kingfisher"
"Come Back Baby"
"When I Was in My Prime"
"Meet on the Bone"
"Travelling Solo"
"The Bonny Boy"
"Chasing Love"
 "Cruel Sister" (Traditional, arranged Jansch, Renbourn, Cox) 
"Yarrow"
"Reynardine"

Personnel
Bert Jansch - vocals, acoustic guitar
Jacqui McShee - vocals
Peter Kirtley - vocals, electric and acoustic guitar
Nigel Portman-Smith - bass, piano, keyboards
Gerry Conway - drums, percussion, conga

References

External links
Hux Records entry for reissue.

Pentangle (band) albums
1994 live albums